West Virginia Route 97 is an east–west state highway in the U.S. state of West Virginia. The western terminus of the route is at U.S. Route 52 and West Virginia Route 80 in Hanover. The eastern terminus is at exit 42 of the West Virginia Turnpike (Interstate 64 and Interstate 77) in Mabscott. West Virginia Route 16, which runs concurrent with WV 97 between Sophia and Mabscott, continues north into Beckley on Robert C. Byrd Drive, the right-of-way of both WV 16 and WV 97.

Major intersections

History
State Route 97 connects U.S. Highway 52 in the western end of Wyoming County with the county seat of Pineville and goes on to State Route 54 in Maben.  Following the linkage of Interstate 64 to the West Virginia Turnpike south of Beckley, the state continued State Route 97 signage across existing State Route 54 to State Route 16 in Sophia and on to the junction with the Turnpike's newly constructed South Valley Drive (now renamed Robert C. Byrd Drive) exit number 42.  As a main thoroughfare in Wyoming County, Route 97 serves the coal industry and its workers, and the heavy truck traffic following brought many accidents and made maintenance nearly impossible. The last 20 years have brought improvements and widening to the road, and it could soon lose much traffic to the Coalfields Expressway, a highway that will link the Turnpike to Pineville, Welch, and Buchanan County, Virginia.

See also
Twin Falls Resort State Park
R.D. Bailey Dam and Lake

References

097
Transportation in Raleigh County, West Virginia
Transportation in Wyoming County, West Virginia